Besar Halimi (born 12 December 1994) is a professional footballer who plays as an attacking midfielder for Greek Super League 2 club Apollon Smyrnis. Born in Germany, he represents the Kosovo national team at international level.

Club career

Early career
Halimi first played for a local club VfL Germania 1894 and joined the youth academy of Eintracht Frankfurt, when he was six years old. In 2007, he transferred to the youth academy of SV Darmstadt 98, where he played until 2009. Where he went to play in the youth team of 1. FC Nürnberg. In the 2011–12 season, he played two matches in the Regionalliga Süd for 1. FC Nürnberg II. In the following season he played 17 matches in the Regionalliga Bayern for the reserves of Nürnberg, where he scored one goal.

On 12 July 2013, Halimi was signed to the VfB Stuttgart II. On 21 September 2013, he made his professional debut in a 3. Liga match against Rot-Weiß Erfurt and he ended the season with 14 matches and one goal. In order to gain more playing time, Halimi signed with Stuttgarter Kickers for the 2014–15 season. In one season he made two goals in 37 league matches for the Kickers and was chosen as the Player of the Month of 3. Liga for November 2014.

Mainz 05
On 12 July 2015, Halimi signed a four-year contract with Bundesliga club Mainz 05, and was immediately loaned out to 2. Bundesliga outfit FSV Frankfurt for the entirety of the 2015–16 season. In the following season, he played for the Mainz 05 II in the 3. Liga.

Brøndby
For the 2017–18 season. Halimi joined Danish Superliga side Brøndby, on a season-long loan. On 13 July 2017, he made his debut with Brøndby in the 2017–18 UEFA Europa League second qualifying round against the Finnish side VPS after coming on as a substitute at 64th minute in place of Kamil Wilczek.

On 30 August 2018, Halimi returned and signed a two-year contract with Danish Superliga club Brøndby. Three days later, he made his debut in a 2–2 home draw against Midtjylland after coming on as a substitute at 76th minute in place of Lasse Vigen.

Sandhausen
On 2 September 2019, Halimi signed a two-year contract with 2. Bundesliga club Sandhausen. On 21 September, he made his debut in a 1–1 home draw against VfL Bochum after being named in the starting line-up. He scored his first goal for Sandhausen against Holstein Kiel on 22 December, exploiting a poor pass from opposing goalkeeper Dominik Reimann in an eventual 2–2 draw.

On 23 December 2020, in the second round of the DFB-Pokal, Halimi made his cup debut for Sandhausen, coming off the bench at half-time for Julius Biada as they were knocked out 4–0 by VfL Wolfsburg. His first goal of the 2020–21 season came on 20 February 2021, as he struck a volley from the edge of the area off a header from Nils Röseler in a 2–1 loss to SC Paderborn; Sandhausen's third loss in a row. 

During his two seasons with Sandhausen, Halimi made 27 total appearances in which he scored two goals, as he failed to become an established starter.

Riga
On 12 July 2021, Halimi joined Latvian Higher League side Riga. Five days later, he made his debut in a 2–3 away win against Spartaks Jūrmala after coming on as a substitute at 66th minute in place of Felipe Brisola.

On 2 March 2022, Halimi had his contract terminated by mutual consent.

International career
From 2011, until 2012, Halimi has been part of Germany at youth international level, respectively has been part of the U18 and U19 teams and he with these teams played 3 matches. On 7 October 2015, he received a call-up from Kosovo for the friendly match against Equatorial Guinea, and made his debut after being named in the starting line-up.

Personal life
Halimi was born in Frankfurt, Germany to Kosovo Albanian parents from the village Malishevë of Gjilan.

Career statistics

Club

International

Scores and results list Kosovo's goal tally first, score column indicates score after each Halimi goal.

|+ List of international goals scored by Besar Halimi
|-
|align="center"|1
|
|Adem Jashari Olympic Stadium, Mitrovica, Kosovo
|
|align="center"|4–3
|align="center"|4–3
|Friendly
|align="center"|
|-
|align="center"|2
|
|Fadil Vokrri Stadium, Pristina, Kosovo
|
|align="center"|4–0
|align="center"|4–0
|Friendly
|align="center"|
|-
|align="center"|3
|
|Estadio de La Cartuja, Seville, Spain
|
|align="center"|1–2
|align="center"|1–3
|2022 FIFA World Cup qualification
|align="center"|
|}

References

External links

1994 births
Living people
Footballers from Frankfurt
Kosovan footballers
Kosovo international footballers
Kosovan expatriate footballers
Expatriate footballers in Germany
Kosovan expatriate sportspeople in Germany
Expatriate men's footballers in Denmark
Kosovan expatriate sportspeople in Denmark
Expatriate footballers in Latvia
Kosovan expatriate sportspeople in Latvia
German footballers
Germany youth international footballers
German people of Kosovan descent
German people of Albanian descent
Sportspeople of Albanian descent
Association football midfielders
Regionalliga players
1. FC Nürnberg II players
3. Liga players
VfB Stuttgart II players
Stuttgarter Kickers players
1. FSV Mainz 05 II players
2. Bundesliga players
FSV Frankfurt players
SV Sandhausen players
Danish Superliga players
Brøndby IF players
Latvian Higher League players
Riga FC players
VfL Germania 1894 players